John Ransom Buck (December 6, 1835 – February 6, 1917) was a U.S. representative from Connecticut.

Pre-congressional years
Buck was born in Glastonbury, Connecticut, to Halsey and Sarah Anne Buck. He attended Wilbraham Academy and Wesleyan University, located at Middletown, Connecticut, where he studied law.

In 1859, he entered the law office of Wells & Strong as a law student. He was admitted to the bar in 1862 and practiced in Hartford. Buck was assistant clerk of the state House of Representatives in 1864 and clerk in 1865. He was clerk of the Senate in 1866, president of the Hartford Court of Common Council in 1868, city attorney 1871 — 1873, treasurer of Hartford County 1873 — 1881 and a member of the Connecticut State Senate in 1880 — 1881.

On April 12, 1865, he married Mary A. Keeney of Manchester, Connecticut. They had two children, Florence K. and John Halsey.

Elections
Buck was elected as a Republican to the Forty-seventh Congress (March 4, 1881—March 3, 1883) and to the Forty-ninth Congress (March 4, 1885—March 3, 1887).  He was an unsuccessful candidate for re-election in 1882 to the Forty-eighth Congress and for the re-election in 1886 to the Fiftieth Congress.

After Congress
He resumed the practice of law in Hartford, Connecticut. After a long battle with illness, Buck died on February 6, 1917. He was interred at Cedar Hill Cemetery.

References

1835 births
1917 deaths
19th-century American politicians
Burials at Cedar Hill Cemetery (Hartford, Connecticut)
Connecticut lawyers
Republican Party Connecticut state senators
People from Glastonbury, Connecticut
Republican Party members of the United States House of Representatives from Connecticut
Wesleyan University alumni
19th-century American lawyers